Sears House may refer to:

Sears Catalog Home, ready-to-assemble kit houses sold by Sears, Roebuck and Company
Sears House (Austin, Arkansas), listed on the NRHP in Arkansas
Dean L. C. Sears House, Searcy, listed on the NRHP in Arkansas
Sears-Kay Ruin, Carefree, listed on the NRHP in Arizona
A. B. Sears House, Chesterville, listed on the NRHP in Ohio
Albert H. Sears House, Plano, listed on the NRHP in Illinois
David Sears House, Boston, listed on the NRHP in Massachusetts
Sears–Ferris House, Carson City, listed on the NRHP in Nevada
Rev. Henry M. and Jennie Sears House, Austin, listed on the NRHP in Texas
Sears House (Staunton, Virginia), listed on the NRHP in Virginia